Acrotome tenuis is a species of flowering plant in the family Lamiaceae. It is native to North Zambia. It was first published in 1932.

References

Lamiaceae
Plants described in 1932
Flora of Zambia